is a Japanese video game composer and musician. Formerly employed by Square Enix, he joined them in 1999 as a synthesizer programmer on Legend of Mana, and worked for them on several games. In 2002, he was promoted to the role of composer, beginning with World Fantasista. He has since composed for several large-budget games, such as The World Ends with You, Dissidia: Final Fantasy, and Final Fantasy Type-0. In addition to his work for Square Enix, he is a composer and guitar player for the bands The Death March and SAWA. He left Square Enix at the end of 2017, becoming a freelancer.

Biography
Ishimoto first got into music as, according to him, he lived in the country and there was nothing else to do. He first worked as a synthesizer programmer before becoming a composer; he began working as such in 1999 with Legend of Mana. Several games later, he began to also work as a composer with the PlayStation 2 soccer game World Fantasista. In 2004 he began to compose for games in the Final Fantasy series, which he had previously worked with as a synthesizer programmer on Final Fantasy X. His last work as a synthesizer programmer was for Kingdom Hearts II in 2005; since then he has worked exclusively for Square Enix as a composer.

Ishimoto was also a member of the Japanese musical group SAWA, with which he performed under the name HIZMI. He formed the band along with Sawa Kato in October 2008. Kato sang some of the songs and wrote the lyrics on Ishimoto's soundtrack for The World Ends with You. The band released an album, 333, in 2008. After SAWA disbanded, he formed The Death March in 2012, a band that plays and re-arrange music from soundtracks composed by Ishimoto. In December 2017, Ishimoto announced that he would be leaving Square Enix and becoming a freelancer. Ishimoto stated that the decision to leave was his own, leaving on amicable terms with the company.

Style and legacy
He was named by IGN as number ten in a top ten JRPG composers list in 2008. Ishimoto composes songs in many different genres, including rock, hip hop, electronica, and pop.

Works

Synthesizer programmer

Composer

Arranger

References

External links
 

1970 births
Anime composers
Japanese composers
Japanese male composers
Living people
Musicians from Miyazaki Prefecture
Square Enix people
Video game composers